The Peru Tribune is a daily newspaper that began publishing on April 16, 1921. The newspaper reports on local news, community events and sports. The Paxton Media Group bought the Peru Tribune and its sister paper the Wabash Plain Dealer in 1998.

The Peru Tribune has won multiple awards for writing, advertising, circulation, editing, photography and typography.

References

External links

Newspapers published in Indiana
Newspapers established in 1921
1921 establishments in Indiana